The Library of Congress (LOC) is a research library in Washington, D.C. that serves as the library of the U.S. Congress and the de facto national library of the United States. Founded in 1800, the library is the United States's oldest federal cultural institution. The library is housed in three buildings in the Capitol Hill area of Washington. The Library also maintains a conservation center in Culpeper, Virginia. The library's functions are overseen by the Librarian of Congress, and its buildings are maintained by the Architect of the Capitol. The Library of Congress is one of the largest libraries in the world. Its collections contain approximately 173 million items, and it has more than 3,000 employees. Its "collections are universal, not limited by subject, format, or national boundary, and include research materials from all parts of the world and in more than 470 languages."

Congress moved to Washington, D.C., in 1800 after holding sessions for eleven years in the temporary national capitals in New York City and Philadelphia. In both cities, members of the U.S. Congress had access to the sizable collections of the New York Society Library and the Library Company of Philadelphia. The small Congressional Library was housed in the United States Capitol for most of the 19th century, until the early 1890s.

Most of the original collection was burnt by British forces during the War of 1812. The library began to restore its collection in 1815. The library purchased Thomas Jefferson's entire personal collection of 6,487 books. Over the next few years, its collection slowly grew, but in 1851, another fire broke out in the Capitol chambers. This destroyed a large amount of the collection, including many of Jefferson's books. After the American Civil War, the importance of the Library of Congress increased with its growth, and there was a campaign to purchase replacement copies for volumes that had been burned. The library received the right of transference of all copyrighted works to deposit two copies of books, maps, illustrations, and diagrams printed in the United States. It also began to build its collections. Its development culminated between 1888 and 1894 with the construction of its own separate, large library, now known as the Thomas Jefferson Building, across the street from the Capitol. Two more adjacent library buildings, the John Adams Building, built in the 1930s, and the James Madison Memorial Building, built in the 1970s, hold expanded parts of the collection and provide space for additional library services.

The library's primary mission is to research inquiries made by members of Congress, which is carried out through the Congressional Research Service. It also houses and oversees the United States Copyright Office. The library is open to the public for research, although only high-ranking government officials and library employees may check out (i.e., remove from the premises) books and materials.

History

1800–1851: Origin and Jefferson's contribution
James Madison of Virginia is credited with the idea of creating a congressional library, first making such a proposition in 1783. Madison's initial proposal was rejected at the time, but represented the first real introduction of the idea of a congressional library. In the years after the Revolutionary War, the Philadelphia Library Company and New York Society Library served as surrogate congressional libraries whenever Congress held session in those respective cities. The Library of Congress was established on April 24, 1800, when President John Adams signed an act of Congress, which also provided for the transfer of the seat of government from Philadelphia to the new capital city of Washington. Part of the legislation appropriated $5,000 "for the purchase of such books as may be necessary for the use of Congress ... and for fitting up a suitable apartment for containing them." Books were ordered from London, and the collection consisted of 740 books and three maps, which were housed in the new United States Capitol.

President Thomas Jefferson played an important role in establishing the structure of the Library of Congress. On January 26, 1802, he signed a bill that allowed the president to appoint the librarian of Congress and established a Joint Committee on the Library to regulate and oversee it. The new law also extended borrowing privileges to the president and vice president.

In August 1814, after routing an American army at Bladensburg, the British bloodlessly occupied Washington, D.C. In retaliation for the American destruction of Port Dover, the British ordered the destruction of numerous public buildings in the city. British troops burned the Library of Congress, including its collection of 3,000 volumes. These volumes had been held in the Senate wing of the Capitol. One of the few congressional volumes to survive was a government account book of receipts and expenditures for 1810. It was taken as a souvenir by British naval officer Sir George Cockburn, whose family returned it to the United States government in 1940.

Within a month, Thomas Jefferson offered to sell his large personal library as a replacement. Congress accepted his offer in January 1815, appropriating $23,950 to purchase his 6,487 books. Some members of the House of Representatives opposed the outright purchase, including New Hampshire representative Daniel Webster. He wanted to return "all books of an atheistical, irreligious, and immoral tendency".

Jefferson had spent 50 years accumulating a wide variety of books in several languages, and on subjects such as philosophy, history, law, religion, architecture, travel, natural sciences, mathematics, studies of classical Greece and Rome, modern inventions, hot air balloons, music, submarines, fossils, agriculture, and meteorology. He had also collected books on topics not normally viewed as part of a legislative library, such as cookbooks. But, he believed that all subjects had a place in the Library of Congress. He remarked:

I do not know that it contains any branch of science which Congress would wish to exclude from their collection; there is, in fact, no subject to which a Member of Congress may not have occasion to refer.

Jefferson's collection was unique in that it was the working collection of a scholar, not a gentleman's collection for display. With the addition of his collection, which doubled the size of the original library, the Library of Congress was transformed from a specialist's library to a more general one. His original collection was organized into a scheme based on Francis Bacon's organization of knowledge. Specifically, Jefferson had grouped his books into Memory, Reason, and Imagination, and broke them into 44 more subdivisions. The library followed Jefferson's organization scheme until the late 19th century, when librarian Herbert Putnam began work on a more flexible Library of Congress Classification structure. This now applies to more than 138 million items.

1851–1865: Weakening

On December 24, 1851, the largest fire in the library's history destroyed 35,000 books, two–thirds of the library's collection, and two-thirds of Jefferson's original transfer. Congress appropriated $168,700 to replace the lost books in 1852 but not to acquire new materials. (By 2008, the librarians of Congress had found replacements for all but 300 of the works that had been documented as being in Jefferson's original collection.) This marked the start of a conservative period in the library's administration by librarian John Silva Meehan and joint committee chairman James A. Pearce, who restricted the library's activities. Meehan and Pearce's views about a restricted scope for the Library of Congress reflected those shared by members of Congress. While Meehan was a librarian, he supported and perpetuated the notion that "the congressional library should play a limited role on the national scene and that its collections, by and large, should emphasize American materials of obvious use to the U.S. Congress." In 1859, Congress transferred the library's public document distribution activities to the Department of the Interior and its international book exchange program to the Department of State.

During the 1850s, Smithsonian Institution librarian Charles Coffin Jewett aggressively tried to develop the Smithsonian as the United States national library. His efforts were rejected by Smithsonian secretary Joseph Henry, who advocated a focus on scientific research and publication. To reinforce his intentions for the Smithsonian, Henry established laboratories, developed a robust physical sciences library, and started the Smithsonian Contributions to Knowledge, the first of many publications intended to disseminate research results. For Henry, the Library of Congress was the obvious choice as the national library. Unable to resolve the conflict, Henry dismissed Jewett in July 1854.

In 1865, the Smithsonian building, also called the Castle due to its Norman architectural style, was severely damaged by fire. This incident presented Henry with an opportunity related to the Smithsonian's non-scientific library. Around this time, the Library of Congress was planning to build and relocate to the new Thomas Jefferson Building, designed to be fireproof. Authorized by an act of Congress, Henry transferred the Smithsonian's non-scientific library of 40,000 volumes to the Library of Congress in 1866.

President Abraham Lincoln appointed John G. Stephenson as librarian of Congress in 1861; the appointment is regarded as the most political to date. Stephenson was a physician and spent equal time serving as librarian and as a physician in the Union Army. He could manage this division of interest because he hired Ainsworth Rand Spofford as his assistant. Despite his new job, Stephenson focused on the war. Three weeks into his term as Librarian of Congress, he left Washington, D.C., to serve as a volunteer aide-de-camp at the battles of Chancellorsville and Gettysburg during the American Civil War. Stephenson's hiring of Spofford, who directed the library in his absence, may have been his most significant achievement.

1865–1897: Spofford's expansion

Librarian Ainsworth Rand Spofford, who directed the Library of Congress from 1865 to 1897, built broad bipartisan support to develop it as a national library and a legislative resource. He was aided by expansion of the federal government after the war and a favorable political climate. He began comprehensively collecting Americana and American literature, led the construction of a new building to house the library, and transformed the librarian of Congress position into one of strength and independence. Between 1865 and 1870, Congress appropriated funds for the construction of the Thomas Jefferson Building, placed all copyright registration and deposit activities under the library's control, and restored the international book exchange. The library also acquired the vast libraries of the Smithsonian and of historian Peter Force, strengthening its scientific and Americana collections significantly. By 1876, the Library of Congress had 300,000 volumes; it was tied with the Boston Public Library as the nation's largest library. It moved from the Capitol building to its new headquarters in 1897 with more than 840,000 volumes, 40 percent of which had been acquired through copyright deposit.

A year before the library's relocation, the Joint Library Committee held hearings to assess the condition of the library and plan for its future growth and possible reorganization. Spofford and six experts sent by the American Library Association testified that the library should continue its expansion to become a true national library. Based on the hearings, Congress authorized a budget that allowed the library to more than double its staff, from 42 to 108 persons. Senators Justin Morrill of Vermont and Daniel W. Voorhees of Indiana were particularly helpful in gaining this support. The library also established new administrative units for all aspects of the collection. In its bill, Congress strengthened the role of Librarian of Congress: it became responsible for governing the library and making staff appointments. As with presidential Cabinet appointments, the Senate was required to approve presidential appointees to the position.

In 1893, Elizabeth Dwyer became the first woman to be appointed to the staff of the library.

1897–1939: Post-reorganization

With this support and the 1897 reorganization, the Library of Congress began to grow and develop more rapidly. Spofford's successor John Russell Young overhauled the library's bureaucracy, used his connections as a former diplomat to acquire more materials from around the world, and established the library's first assistance programs for the blind and physically disabled.

Young's successor Herbert Putnam held the office for forty years from 1899 to 1939. Two years after he took office, the library became the first in the United States to hold one million volumes. Putnam focused his efforts to make the library more accessible and useful for the public and for other libraries. He instituted the interlibrary loan service, transforming the Library of Congress into what he referred to as a "library of last resort". Putnam also expanded library access to "scientific investigators and duly qualified individuals", and began publishing primary sources for the benefit of scholars.

During Putnam's tenure, the library broadened the diversity of its acquisitions. In 1903, Putnam persuaded President Theodore Roosevelt to use an executive order to transfer the papers of the Founding Fathers from the State Department to the Library of Congress.

Putnam expanded foreign acquisitions as well, including the 1904 purchase of a 4,000-volume library of Indica, the 1906 purchase of G. V. Yudin's 80,000-volume Russian library, the 1908 Schatz collection of early opera librettos, and the early 1930s purchase of the Russian Imperial Collection, consisting of 2,600 volumes from the library of the Romanov family on a variety of topics. Collections of Hebraica, Chinese, and Japanese works were also acquired. On one occasion, Congress initiated an acquisition: in 1929 Congressman Ross Collins (D-Mississippi) gained approval for the library to purchase Otto Vollbehr's collection of incunabula for $1.5 million. This collection included one of three remaining perfect vellum copies of the Gutenberg Bible.

Putnam established the Legislative Reference Service (LRS) in 1914 as a separative administrative unit of the library. Based on the Progressive era's philosophy of science to be used to solve problems, and modeled after successful research branches of state legislatures, the LRS would provide informed answers to Congressional research inquiries on almost any topic. Congress passed in 1925 an act allowing the Library of Congress to establish a trust fund board to accept donations and endowments, giving the library a role as a patron of the arts. The library received donations and endowments by such prominent wealthy individuals as John D. Rockefeller, James B. Wilbur, and Archer M. Huntington. Gertrude Clarke Whittall donated five Stradivarius violins to the library. Elizabeth Sprague Coolidge's donations paid for a concert hall to be constructed within the Library of Congress building and an honorarium established for the Music Division to pay live performers for concerts. A number of chairs and consultantships were established from the donations, the most well-known of which is the Poet Laureate Consultant.
The library's expansion eventually filled the library's Main Building, although it used shelving expansions in 1910 and 1927. The library needed to expand into a new structure. Congress acquired nearby land in 1928 and approved construction of the Annex Building (later known as the John Adams Building) in 1930. Although delayed during the Depression years, it was completed in 1938 and opened to the public in 1939.

1939–1987: National versus legislative role

After Putnam retired in 1939, President Franklin D. Roosevelt appointed poet and writer Archibald MacLeish as his successor. Occupying the post from 1939 to 1944 during the height of World War II, MacLeish became the most widely known librarian of Congress in the library's history. MacLeish encouraged librarians to oppose totalitarianism on behalf of democracy; dedicated the South Reading Room of the Adams Building to Thomas Jefferson, and commissioned artist Ezra Winter to paint four themed murals for the room. He established a "democracy alcove" in the Main Reading Room of the Jefferson Building for essential documents such as the Declaration of Independence, the Constitution, and The Federalist Papers. The Library of Congress assisted during the war effort, ranging from storage of the Declaration of Independence and the United States Constitution in Fort Knox for safekeeping to researching weather data on the Himalayas for Air Force pilots. MacLeish resigned in 1944 when appointed as Assistant Secretary of State.

President Harry Truman appointed Luther H. Evans as librarian of Congress. Evans, who served until 1953, expanded the library's acquisitions, cataloging, and bibliographic services. But he is best known for creating Library of Congress Missions worldwide. Missions played a variety of roles in the postwar world: the mission in San Francisco assisted participants in the meeting that established the United Nations, the mission in Europe acquired European publications for the Library of Congress and other American libraries, and the mission in Japan aided in the creation of the National Diet Library.

Evans' successor Lawrence Quincy Mumford took over in 1953. During his tenure, lasting until 1974, Mumford directed the initiation of construction of the James Madison Memorial Building, the third Library of Congress building on Capitol Hill. Mumford led the library during the government's increased educational spending. The library was able to establish new acquisition centers abroad, including in Cairo and New Delhi. In 1967, the library began experimenting with book preservation techniques through a Preservation Office. This has developed as the most extensive library research and conservation effort in the United States.

During Mumford's administration, the last significant public debate occurred about the Library of Congress's role as both a legislative and national library. Asked by Joint Library Committee chairman Senator Claiborne Pell (D-RI) to assess operations and make recommendations, Douglas Bryant of Harvard University Library proposed several institutional reforms. These included expanding national activities and services and various organizational changes, all of which would emphasize the library's federal role rather than its legislative role. Bryant suggested changing the name of the Library of Congress, a recommendation rebuked by Mumford as "unspeakable violence to tradition." The debate continued within the library community for some time. The Legislative Reorganization Act of 1970 renewed emphasis for the library on its legislative roles, requiring a greater focus on research for Congress and congressional committees, and renaming the Legislative Reference Service as the Congressional Research Service.

After Mumford retired in 1974, President Gerald Ford appointed historian Daniel J. Boorstin as a librarian. Boorstin's first challenge was to manage the relocation of some sections to the new Madison Building, which took place between 1980 and 1982. With this accomplished, Boorstin focused on other areas of library administration, such as acquisitions and collections. Taking advantage of steady budgetary growth, from $116 million in 1975 to over $250 million by 1987, Boorstin enhanced institutional and staff ties with scholars, authors, publishers, cultural leaders, and the business community. His activities changed the post of librarian of Congress so that by the time he retired in 1987, The New York Times called this office "perhaps the leading intellectual public position in the nation."

1987–present: Digitization and programs
President Ronald Reagan nominated historian James H. Billington as the 13th librarian of Congress in 1987, and the U.S. Senate unanimously confirmed the appointment.

Under Billington's leadership, the library doubled the size of its analog collections from 85.5 million items in 1987 to more than 160 million items in 2014. At the same time, it established new programs and employed new technologies to "get the champagne out of the bottle". These included:
American Memory created in 1990, which became the National Digital Library in 1994. It provides free access online to digitized American history and culture resources, including primary sources, with curatorial explanations to support use in K-12 education.
Thomas.gov website launched in 1994 to provide free public access to U.S. federal legislative information with ongoing updates; and Congress.gov website to provide a state-of-the-art framework for both Congress and the public in 2012;
National Book Festival, founded in 2001 with First Lady Laura Bush, has attracted more than 1,000 authors and a million guests to the National Mall and the Washington Convention Center to celebrate reading. With a major gift from David Rubenstein in 2013, the library established the Library of Congress Literacy Awards to recognize and support achievements in improving literacy in the U.S. and abroad;
Kluge Center, started with a grant of $60 million from John W. Kluge in 2000, brings international scholars and researchers to use library resources and to interact with policymakers and the public. It hosts public lectures and scholarly events, provides endowed Kluge fellowships, and awards the Kluge Prize for the Study of Humanity (now worth $1.5 million), the first Nobel-level international prize for lifetime achievement in the humanities and social sciences (subjects not included in the Nobel awards);
Open World Leadership Center, established in 2000; by 2015 this program administered 23,000 professional exchanges for emerging post-Soviet leaders in Russia, Ukraine, and other successor states of the former USSR. Open World began as a Library of Congress project, and later was established as an independent agency in the legislative branch.
Veterans History Project, congressionally mandated in 2000 to collect, preserve, and make accessible the personal accounts of American war veterans from World War I to the present day;
National Audio-Visual Conservation Center opened in 2007 at a 45-acre site in Culpeper, Virginia, established with a gift of more than $150 million by the Packard Humanities Institute, and $82.1 million in additional support from Congress.

Since 1988, the library has administered the National Film Preservation Board. Established by congressional mandate, it selects twenty-five American films annually for preservation and inclusion in the National Film Registry, a collection of American films, for which the Library of Congress accepts nominations each year. There also exists a National Recording Registry administered by the National Recording Preservation Board that serves a similar purpose, albeit for music and sound recordings. 

The library has made some of these available on the Internet for free streaming and additionally has provided brief essays on the films that have been added to the registry. By 2015, the librarian had named 650 films to the registry. The films in the collection date from the earliest period to ones produced more than ten years ago; they are selected from nominations submitted to the board. Further programs included:

Gershwin Prize for Popular Song, was launched in 2007 to honor the work of an artist whose career reflects lifetime achievement in song composition. Winners have included Paul Simon, Stevie Wonder, Paul McCartney, Burt Bacharach and Hal David, Carole King, Billy Joel, and Willie Nelson, as of 2015. The library also launched the Living Legend Awards in 2000 to honor artists, activists, filmmakers, and others who have contributed to America's diverse cultural, scientific, and social heritage;
Fiction Prize (now the Library of Congress Prize for American Fiction) was started in 2008 to recognize distinguished lifetime achievement in the writing of fiction.
World Digital Library, established in association with UNESCO and 181 partners in 81 countries in 2009, makes copies of professionally curated primary materials of the world's varied cultures freely available online in multiple languages.
National Jukebox, launched in 2011, provides streaming free online access to more than 10,000 out-of-print music and spoken-word recordings.
BARD was started in 2013; it is a digital, talking books mobile app for braille and audio reading downloads, in partnership with the library's National Library Service for the blind and physically handicapped. It enables free downloads of audio and braille books to mobile devices via the Apple App Store.

During Billington's tenure, the library acquired General Lafayette's papers in 1996 from a castle at La Grange, France; they had previously been inaccessible.

It also acquired the only copy of the 1507 Waldseemüller world map ("America's birth certificate") in 2003; it is on permanent display in the library's Thomas Jefferson Building.

Using privately raised funds, the Library of Congress has created a reconstruction of Thomas Jefferson's original library. This has been on permanent display in the Jefferson building since 2008.

Under Billington, public spaces of the Jefferson Building were enlarged and technologically enhanced to serve as a national exhibition venue. It has hosted more than 100 exhibitions. These included exhibits on the Vatican Library and the Bibliothèque Nationale de France, several on the Civil War and Lincoln, on African-American culture, on Religion and the founding of the American Republic, the Early Americas (the Kislak Collection became a permanent display), on the global celebration commemorating the 800th anniversary of the Magna Carta, and on early American printing, featuring the Rubenstein Bay Psalm Book.

Onsite access to the Library of Congress has been increased. Billington gained an underground connection between the new U.S. Capitol Visitors Center and the library in 2008 in order to increase both congressional usage and public tours of the library's Thomas Jefferson Building.

In 2001, the library began a mass deacidification program, in order to extend the lifespan of almost 4 million volumes and 12 million manuscript sheets. In 2002, a new storage facility was completed at Fort Meade, Maryland, where a collection of storage modules have preserved and made accessible more than 4 million items from the library's analog collections.

Billington established the Library Collections Security Oversight Committee in 1992 to improve protection of the collections, and also the Library of Congress Congressional Caucus in 2008 to draw attention to the library's curators and collections. He created the library's first Young Readers Center in the Jefferson Building in 2009, and the first large-scale summer intern (Junior Fellows) program for university students in 1991.

Under Billington, the library sponsored the Gateway to Knowledge in 2010 to 2011, a mobile exhibition to ninety sites, covering all states east of the Mississippi, in a specially designed eighteen-wheel truck. This increased public access to library collections off-site, particularly for rural populations, and helped raise awareness of what was also available online.

Billington raised more than half a billion dollars of private support to supplement Congressional appropriations for library collections, programs, and digital outreach. These private funds helped the library to continue its growth and outreach in the face of a 30% decrease in staffing, caused mainly by legislative appropriations cutbacks. He created the library's first development office for private fundraising in 1987. In 1990, he established the James Madison Council, the library's first national private sector donor-support group. In 1987, Billington also asked the Government Accountability Office (GAO) to conduct the first library-wide audit. He created the first Office of the Inspector General at the library to provide regular, independent reviews of library operations. This precedent has resulted in regular annual financial audits at the library; it has received unmodified ("clean") opinions from 1995 onward. In April 2010, the library announced plans to archive all public communication on Twitter, including all communication since Twitter's launch in March 2006. , the Twitter archive remains unfinished.

Before retiring in 2015, after 28 years of service, Billington had come "under pressure" as librarian of Congress. This followed a GAO report that described a "work environment lacking central oversight" and faulted Billington for "ignoring repeated calls to hire a chief information officer, as required by law."

When Billington announced his plans to retire in 2015, commentator George Weigel described the Library of Congress as "one of the last refuges in Washington of serious bipartisanship and calm, considered conversation," and "one of the world's greatest cultural centers."
Carla Hayden was sworn in as the 14th librarian of Congress on September 14, 2016, the first woman and the first African American to hold the position.

In 2017, the library announced the Librarian-in-Residence program, which aims to support the future generation of librarians by giving them the opportunity to gain work experience in five different areas of librarianship, including: Acquisitions/Collection Development, Cataloging/Metadata, and Collection Preservation.

On January 6, 2021, at 1:11 PM EST, the Library's Madison Building and the Cannon House Office Building were the first buildings in the Capitol Complex to be ordered to evacuate as rioters breached security perimeters before storming the Capitol building. Hayden clarified two days later that rioters did not breach any of the Library's buildings or collections and all staff members were safely evacuated.

On February 14, 2023, the Library announced that the Lilly Endowment gifted $2.5 million, five-year grant to "launch programs that foster greater understanding of religious cultures in Africa, Central Asia and the Middle East". The Library plans to leverage the donation in these areas:

 Produce a book and a film about Omar ibn Said
 Provide public access to "programs that enhance knowledge about faiths practiced in the regions, including Indigenous African religious traditions, Judaism, Christianity and Islam, and their influence on daily life."

Holdings

The collections of the Library of Congress include more than 32 million catalogued books and other print materials in 470 languages; more than 61 million manuscripts; the largest rare book collection in North America, including the rough draft of the Declaration of Independence, a Gutenberg Bible (originating from the Saint Blaise Abbey, Black Forest—one of only three perfect vellum copies known to exist); over 1 million U.S. government publications; 1 million issues of world newspapers spanning the past three centuries; 33,000 bound newspaper volumes; 500,000 microfilm reels; U.S. and foreign comic books—over 12,000 titles in all, totaling more than 140,000 issues; 1.9 million moving images (as of 2020); 5.3 million maps; 6 million works of sheet music; 3 million sound recordings; more than 14.7 million prints and photographic images including fine and popular art pieces and architectural drawings; the Betts Stradivarius; and the Cassavetti Stradivarius.

The library developed a system of book classification called Library of Congress Classification (LCC), which is used by most U.S. research and university libraries.

The library serves as a legal repository for copyright protection and copyright registration, and as the base for the United States Copyright Office. Regardless of whether they register their copyright, all publishers are required to submit two complete copies of their published works to the library—this requirement is known as mandatory deposit. Nearly 15,000 new items published in the U.S. arrive every business day at the library. Contrary to popular belief, however, the library does not retain all of these works in its permanent collection, although it does add an average of 12,000 items per day. Rejected items are used in trades with other libraries around the world, distributed to federal agencies, or donated to schools, communities, and other organizations within the United States.

As is true of many similar libraries, the Library of Congress retains copies of every publication in the English language that is deemed significant.
A 2000 study by information scientists Peter Lyman and Hal Varian suggested that the amount of uncompressed textual data represented by the 26 million books then in the collection was 10 terabytes.

The library also administers the National Library Service for the Blind and Physically Handicapped, an audio book and braille library program provided to more than 766,000 Americans.

The smallest book on file, Old King Cole, measures in at 1/25" × 1/25".

Digital
The library's first digitization project was called "American Memory". Launched in 1990, it initially planned to choose 160 million objects from its collection to make digitally available on LaserDiscs and CDs that would be distributed to schools and libraries.

After realizing that this plan would be too expensive and inefficient, and with the rise of the Internet, the library decided to instead make digitized material available over the Internet. This project was made official in the National Digital Library Program (NDLP), created in October 1994. By 1999, the NDLP had succeeded in digitizing over 5 million objects and had a budget of $12 million. The library has kept the "American Memory" name for its public domain website, which today contains 15 million digital objects, comprising over 7 petabytes of data.

American Memory is a source for public domain image resources, as well as audio, video, and archived Web content.

Nearly all of the lists of holdings, the catalogs of the library, can be consulted directly on its website. Librarians all over the world consult these catalogs, through the Web or through other media better suited to their needs, when they need to catalog for their collection a book published in the United States. They use the Library of Congress Control Number to make sure of the exact identity of the book.

Digital images are also available at Snapshots of the Past, which provides archival prints.
The library has a budget of $6–8 million each year for digitization, meaning that not all works can be digitized. It makes determinations about what objects to prioritize based on what is especially important to Congress or potentially interesting for the public. The 15 million digitized items represent less than 10% of the library's total 160-million-item collection.

The library has chosen not to participate in other digital library projects such as Google Books and the Digital Public Library of America, although it has supported the Internet Archive project.

Congressional
In 1995, the Library of Congress established an online archive of the proceedings of the U.S. Congress, THOMAS. The THOMAS website included the full text of proposed legislation, as well as bill summaries and statuses, Congressional Record text, and the Congressional Record Index. The THOMAS system received major updates in 2005 and 2010. A migration to a more modernized Web system, Congress.gov, began in 2012, and the THOMAS system was retired in 2016. Congress.gov is a joint project of the Library of Congress, the House, the Senate and the Government Publishing Office.

Buildings

The Library of Congress is physically housed in three buildings on Capitol Hill and a conservation center in rural Virginia. The library's Capitol Hill buildings are all connected by underground passageways, so that a library user need pass through security only once in a single visit. The library also has off-site storage facilities in Maryland for less commonly requested materials.

Thomas Jefferson Building

The Thomas Jefferson Building is located between Independence Avenue and East Capitol Street on First Street SE. It first opened in 1897 as the main building of the library and is the oldest of the three buildings. Known originally as the Library of Congress Building or Main Building, it took its present name on June 13, 1980.

John Adams Building

The John Adams Building is located between Independence Avenue and East Capitol Street on 2nd Street SE, the block adjacent to the Jefferson Building. The building was originally known as The Annex to the Main Building, which had run out of space. It opened its doors to the public on January 3, 1939. Initially, it also housed the U.S. Copyright Office which moved to the Madison building in the 1970s.

James Madison Memorial Building

The James Madison Memorial Building is located between First and Second Streets on Independence Avenue SE. The building was constructed from 1971 to 1976, and serves as the official memorial to President James Madison.

The Madison Building is also home to the U.S. Copyright Office and to the Mary Pickford Theater, the "motion picture and television reading room" of the Library of Congress. The theater hosts regular free screenings of classic and contemporary movies and television shows.

Packard Campus for Audio-Visual Conservation

The Packard Campus for Audio-Visual Conservation is the Library of Congress's newest building, opened in 2007 and located in Culpeper, Virginia. It was constructed out of a former Federal Reserve storage center and Cold War bunker. The campus is designed to act as a single site to store all of the library's movie, television, and sound collections. It is named to honor David Woodley Packard, whose Packard Humanities Institute oversaw the design and construction of the facility. The centerpiece of the complex is a reproduction Art Deco movie theater that presents free movie screenings to the public on a semi-weekly basis.

Copyright Act

The Library of Congress, through both the librarian of Congress and the register of copyrights, is responsible for authorizing exceptions to Section 1201 of Title 17 of the United States Code as part of the Digital Millennium Copyright Act. This process is done every three years, with the register receiving proposals from the public and acting as an advisor to the librarian, who issues a ruling on what is exempt. After three years have passed, the ruling is no longer valid and a new ruling on exemptions must be made.

Access
The library is open for academic research to anyone with a Reader Identification Card. One may not remove library items from the reading rooms or the library buildings. Most of the library's general collection of books and journals are in the closed stacks of the Jefferson and Adams Buildings; specialized collections of books and other materials are in closed stacks in all three main library buildings, or are stored off-site. Access to the closed stacks is not permitted under any circumstances, except to authorized library staff, and occasionally, to dignitaries. Only the reading room reference collections are on open shelves.

Since 1902, American libraries have been able to request books and other items through interlibrary loan from the Library of Congress if these items are not readily available elsewhere. Through this system, the Library of Congress has served as a "library of last resort", according to former Librarian of Congress Herbert Putnam. The Library of Congress lends books to other libraries with the stipulation that they be used only inside the borrowing library.

Standards
In addition to its library services, the Library of Congress is also actively involved in various standard activities in areas related to bibliographical and search and retrieval standards. Areas of work include MARC standards, Metadata Encoding and Transmission Standard (METS), Metadata Object Description Schema (MODS), Z39.50 and Search/Retrieve Web Service (SRW), and Search/Retrieve via URL (SRU).

The Law Library of Congress seeks to further legal scholarship by providing opportunities for scholars and practitioners to conduct significant legal research. Individuals are invited to apply for projects which would further the multi-faceted mission of the law library in serving the U.S. Congress, other governmental agencies, and the public.

Annual events
Fellows in American Letters of the Library of Congress
Gershwin Prize for Popular Song
Library of Congress Prize for American Fiction
Founder's Day Celebration
National Book Festival
Mostly Lost Film Identification Workshop

Notable personnel

Henriette Avram: Developed the MARC format (Machine Readable Cataloging), the international data standard for bibliographic and holdings information in libraries. 
John Y. Cole: founder of the Center for the Book and first historian of the Library of Congress.
Cecil Hobbs: American scholar of Southeast Asian history, head of the Southern Asia Section of the Orientalia (now Asian) Division of the Library of Congress, and a major contributor to scholarship on Asia and the development of South East Asian coverage in American library collections.
Julius C. Jefferson Jr., head of the Congressional Research Service, president of the American Library Association (2020–2021), president of the Freedom to Read Foundation (2013–2016).

See also

Notes

References

Mearns, David Chambers. The Story Up to Now: The Library Of Congress, 1800–1946 (1947), detailed narrative

Architecture
Cole, John Y. and Henry Hope Reed. The Library of Congress: The Art and Architecture of the Thomas Jefferson Building (1998) excerpt and text search
Small, Herbert, and Henry Hope Reed. The Library of Congress: Its Architecture and Decoration (1983)

Further reading

Bisbort, Alan, and Linda Barrett Osborne. The Nation's Library: The Library of Congress, Washington, D. C. (Library of Congress, 2000)
Cole, John Young. Jefferson's legacy: a brief history of the Library of Congress (Library of Congress, 1993)
Cole, John Young. "The library of congress becomes a world library, 1815–2005." Libraries & culture (2005) 40#3: 385–398. in Project MUSE
Cope, R. L. "Management Review of the Library of Congress: The 1996 Booz Allen & Hamilton Report," Australian Academic & Research Libraries (1997) 28#1 online
Ostrowski, Carl. Books, Maps, and Politics: A Cultural History of the Library of Congress, 1783–1861 (2004) online
Rosenberg, Jane Aiken. The Nation's Great Library: Herbert Putnam and the Library of Congress, 1899–1939 (University of Illinois Press, 1993)

External links

The Library of Congress website
Library of Congress channel on YouTube
Search the Library of Congress catalog
Congress.gov, legislative information
Library Of Congress Meeting Notices and Rule Changes from The Federal Register RSS Feed
Library of Congress photos on Flickr
Outdoor sculpture at the Library of Congress

Library of Congress at FamilySearch Research Wiki for genealogists

C-SPAN's Library of Congress documentary and resources 
The Library of Congress National Library Service (NLS)
Video: "Library of Congress in 1968 – Computer Automation"
Library of Congress Web Archives – search by URL

 
1800 establishments in Washington, D.C.
Agencies of the United States Congress
Archives in the United States
Buildings of the United States government in Washington, D.C.
Capitol Hill
Deposit libraries
Genealogical libraries in the United States
Government agencies established in 1800
History museums in Washington, D.C.
Photo archives
Photo archives in the United States
Legislative libraries
Libraries established in 1800
Congress, Library of
Congress
World Digital Library partners
Research libraries in the United States